Antheraea is a moth genus belonging to the family Saturniidae. The genus was erected by Jacob Hübner in 1819. Several species of this genus have caterpillars which produce wild silk of commercial importance. Commonly called "tussar silk", the moths are named tussar moths after the fabric.

Taxonomy

Species
The genus includes these species:

 Antheraea alleni Holloway, 1987
 Antheraea alorensis U. Paukstadt & L.h. Paukstadt, 2005
 Antheraea andamana Moore, 1877
 Antheraea angustomarginata Brechlin & Meister, 2009
 Antheraea assamensis Helfer, 1837
 Antheraea billitonensis Moore, 1878
 Antheraea broschi Naumann, 2001
 Antheraea brunei Allen & Holloway, 1986
 Antheraea castanea Jordan, 1910 (= A. mezops)
 Antheraea celebensis Watson, 1915
 Antheraea cernyi Brechlin, 2002
 Antheraea cihangiri Naumann & Naessig, 1998
 Antheraea cingalesa Moore, 1883
 Antheraea compta Rothschild, 1899
 Antheraea cordifolia Weymer, 1906
 Antheraea crypta Chu & Wang, 1993
 Antheraea diehli Lemaire, 1979
 Antheraea exspectata Brechlin, 2000
 Antheraea fickei Weymer, 1909
 Antheraea formosana Sonan, 1937
 Antheraea frithi Moore, 1859
 Antheraea fusca Rothschild, 1903
 Antheraea gephyra Niepelt, 1926
 Antheraea godmani (Druce, 1892)
 Antheraea gschwandneri Niepelt, 1918
 Antheraea gulata Naessig & Treadaway, 1998
 Antheraea hagedorni Naumann & Lourens, 2008
 Antheraea halconensis U. Paukstadt & Brosch, 1996
 Antheraea harndti Naumann, 1999
 Antheraea helferi Moore, 1859
 Antheraea hollowayi Naessig & Naumann, 1998
 Antheraea imperator Watson, 1913
 Antheraea jakli Naumann, 2008
 Antheraea jana (Stoll, 1782)
 Antheraea jawabaratensis Brechlin & Paukstadt, 2010
 Antheraea kageri U. Paukstadt, L. Paukstadt & Suhardjono, 1997
 Antheraea kalangensis Brechlin & Meister, 2009
 Antheraea kelimutuensis U. Paukstadt, L. Paukstadt & Suhardjono, 1997
 Antheraea knyvetti Hampson, 1893
?Antheraea korintjiana
 Antheraea lampei Naessig & Holloway, 1989
 Antheraea larissa (Westwood, 1847)
 Antheraea larissoides Bouvier, 1928
 Antheraea lorosae M.D. Lane, Naumann & D.A. Lane, 2004
 Antheraea meisteri Brechlin, 2002
 Antheraea mentawai Naessig, Lampe & Kager, 2002
 Antheraea minahassae Niepelt, 1926
 Antheraea montezuma (Salle, 1856)
 Antheraea moultoni Watson, 1927
 Antheraea myanmarensis U. Paukstadt, L. Paukstadt & Brosch, 1998
 Antheraea mylittoides Bouvier, 1928
 Antheraea pahangensis Brechlin & Paukstadt, 2010
 Antheraea oculea (Neumoegen, 1883)
 Antheraea paphia Linnaeus, 1758 (= A. mylitta)
 Antheraea pasteuri Bouvier, 1928
 Antheraea paukpelengensis Brechlin & Meister, 2009
 Antheraea paukstadtorum Naumann, Holloway & Naessig, 1996
 Antheraea pedunculata Bouvier, 1936
 Antheraea pelengensis Brechlin, 2000
 Antheraea pernyi (Guérin-Méneville, 1855) – Chinese tussar moth
 Antheraea perrottetii (Guérin-Méneville, 1843)
 Antheraea platessa Rothschild, 1903
 Antheraea polyphemus (Cramer, 1775) – Polyphemus moth
 Antheraea pratti Bouvier, 1928
 Antheraea prelarissa Bouvier, 1928
 Antheraea raffrayi Bouvier, 1928
 Antheraea ranakaensis U. Paukstadt, L. Paukstadt & Suhardjono, 1997
 Antheraea rosemariae Holloway, Naessig & Naumann, 1995
 Antheraea rosieri (Toxopeus, 1940)
 Antheraea roylei Moore, 1859
 Antheraea rubicunda Brechlin, 2009
 Antheraea rumphii (Felder, 1861)
 Antheraea schroederi U. Paukstadt, Brosch & L. Paukstadt, 1999
 Antheraea semperi C. & R. Felder, 1861
 Antheraea steinkeorum U. Paukstadt, L. Paukstadt & Brosch, 1999
 Antheraea subcaeca Bouvier, 1928
 Antheraea sumatrana Niepelt, 1926
 Antheraea sumbawaensis Brechlin, 2000
 Antheraea superba Inoue, 1964
 Antheraea surakarta Moore, 1862
 Antheraea taripaensis Naumann, Naessig & Holloway, 1996
 Antheraea tenggarensis Brechlin, 2000
 Antheraea ulrichbroschi U. & L. Paukstadt, 1999
 Antheraea vietnamensis Brechlin & Paukstadt, 2010
 Antheraea viridiscura Holloway, Naessig & Naumann, 1996
 Antheraea yamamai (Guérin-Méneville, 1861) – Japanese oak silk moth

Hybrids
 Antheraea × proylei (A. pernyi male × A. roylei female)
 Antheraea polyphemus male × Antheraea paphia female (1960 - Gary Botting) (using pheromone transfer)
 Antheraea polyphemus male × Antheraea yamamai female (1959 - Gary Botting) (using pheromone transfer)

Footnotes

References
 Tuskes, PM, JP Tuttle and MM Collins. 1996. The Wild Silk Moths of North America. Cornell University Press. 
 "Studies on the filament of tasar silkworm, Antheraea mylitta D (Andhra local ecorace)." G. Shamitha and A. Purushotham Rao. Current Science, Vol. 90, No. 12, 25 June 2006, pp. 1667–1671. PDF file downloadable from:

External links
 "Raw & Organic Silk: Facts behind the Fibers" 
 "Walter Sweadner and the Wild Silk Moths of the Bitteroot  Mountains. By Michael M. Collins. 
 Downloadable pdf file on Antheraea yamamai (in German) 
 "Antheraea Hübner, [1819] 1816" 

 
Moth genera
Taxa named by Jacob Hübner
Wild silk